Enter was an American magazine published from October 1983 to May 1985 by Children's Television Workshop (CTW, later renamed Sesame Workshop). The magazine was published ten times per year. Seventeen issues were printed. Similar to sibling titles Sesame Street, The Electric Company, and 3-2-1 Contact magazines, the title was aimed at school-age children.

The focus of the magazine was, as declared on the cover, "The world of computers and new technology". Each issue included programs in the BASIC computer language, which readers could type into their own home computer.  Readers were introduced to technological innovations of the day, such as optical disc recording technology, which was new at the time.

Unlike other magazines produced by Children's Television Workshop, Enter did not tie into a television series produced by the organization. Beginning in June 1985, some of its features were folded into 3-2-1 Contact magazine, which printed computer programs as part of an "Enter section" for a short while.  This section was later renamed "BASIC training."

References

External links
 The Internet Archive has all issues (1–17) here: https://archive.org/details/enter-magazine 
 Retromags have posted all the issues as well: https://www.retromags.com/magazines/usa/enter/ 

Children's magazines published in the United States
Defunct computer magazines published in the United States
Education magazines
Magazines established in 1983
Magazines disestablished in 1985
Magazines published in New York City
Sesame Workshop
Ten times annually magazines